Betula minor, the dwarf white birch, is a species of birch which can be found in Eastern Canada and in such US states as Maine, New Hampshire, and New York.

References

minor
Flora of Eastern Canada
Flora of Maine
Flora of New Hampshire
Flora of New York (state)
Flora without expected TNC conservation status